Habib Jafar Akal (born 1 July 1966) is a former Iraqi footballer. He was featured on the national team many times and is remembered for competing in various Gulf Cup competitions. In the 1988 Gulf Cup, he was voted as the best player of the competition. He became a regular of the national team at a young age and was almost even called up for the 1986 World Cup in Mexico, but he was thought to be to inexperienced by then-coach, Evaristo de Macedo.

Career
He was a key player in the Iraqi national team during the late 1980s and through the 1990s. Habib first appeared in the national team in 1988, playing in the Arab Championship, Olympics in Seoul and the Gulf Cup, where he was voted as player of the tournament. Was an important part of a talented Iraqi side that nearly qualified for the World Cup in 1994. However, in their penultimate match against Iran, he was sent off receiving a red card, and did not participate in their next and last game against Japan.

He spent his time with clubs in Iraq, and spent a 4-year spell in Qatar with Al-Rayyan, Al-Ittihad (now known as "Al-Gharaffa"), and Al-Wakra, and in the latest part of his career, with Dhofar of Oman.

Retired from the international scene after being omitted from the Asian Cup squad in Lebanon in 2000, by Milan Zivadinovic, but was surprisingly brought back by Adnan Hamad after the sacking of Milan in February 2001. Habib was placed by the German-based Federation of Football History & Statistics as Iraq's 3rd best player of the century.

Career statistics

International goals
Scores and results list Iraq's goal tally first.

See also
 9th Arabian Gulf Cup

References

External links
 Info on Habib Jaafar
 Habib Jaafar - Iraqi football; Hall of Fame

Sportspeople from Baghdad
Iraqi footballers
Living people
Expatriate footballers in Oman
Qatar Stars League players
1966 births
Iraq international footballers
Olympic footballers of Iraq
Footballers at the 1988 Summer Olympics
Iraqi expatriate footballers
Expatriate footballers in Qatar
Iraqi expatriate sportspeople in Qatar
Iraqi expatriate sportspeople in Oman
Al-Talaba SC players
Al-Rasheed players
Association football wingers